Enthesitis is inflammation of the entheses, the sites where tendons or ligaments insert into the bone. It is an enthesopathy, a pathologic condition of the entheses. Early clinical manifestations are an aching sensation akin to "working out too much", and it gets better with activity. It is worse in the morning (after sleeping and not moving). The muscle insertion hurts very focally as it joins into the bone, but there is little to no pain at all with passive motion. There are some cases of isolated, primary enthesitis which are very poorly studied and understood. It is known to be associated with other autoimmune diseases, like spondyloarthropathies and psoriasis (thought to often precede psoriatic arthritis). A common autoimmune enthesitis is at the heel, where the Achilles tendon attaches to the calcaneus. 

It is associated with HLA B27 arthropathies, such as ankylosing spondylitis, psoriatic arthritis, and reactive arthritis. Symptoms include multiple points of tenderness at the heel, tibial tuberosity, iliac crest, and other tendon insertion sites.

Images

Related conditions
Anatomically close but separate conditions are:
Apophysitis, inflammation of the bony attachment, generally associated with overuse among growing children. 
Tendinopathy is a disorder of the tendon, and is associated with direct injury or repetitive activities.

See also

 Enthesis  (plural: Entheses)

References

External links 

Rheumatology